

Films

LGBT
1975 in LGBT history
1975
1975